The Hebron Methodist Protestant Church and Cemetery is a historic church property at 18282 Seashore Highway near Georgetown, Delaware.  The church is a single-story wood-frame structure, with a gable roof and clapboard siding, built in 1888 for a Methodist congregation.  It is architecturally distinguished for its interior, which is, unlike most period Delaware church, has walls finished in wood paneling instead of plaster.  Regular services at the church ended in 1934.

The property was added to the National Register of Historic Places in 2015.

See also
National Register of Historic Places listings in Sussex County, Delaware

References

United Methodist churches in Delaware
Churches on the National Register of Historic Places in Delaware
Churches completed in 1888
Churches in Sussex County, Delaware
National Register of Historic Places in Sussex County, Delaware